Acrylfentanyl (also known as acryloylfentanyl or Egyptenyl) is a highly potent opioid analgesic that is an analog of fentanyl and has been sold online as a designer drug. In animal studies the IC50 or half maximal inhibitory concentration for acrylfentanyl to displace naloxone is 1.4 nM, being slightly more potent than fentanyl itself (1.6 nM) as well as having a longer duration of action.

Side effects 

Side effects of fentanyl analogs are similar to those of fentanyl itself, which include itching, nausea and potentially serious respiratory depression, which can be life-threatening. Fentanyl analogs have killed hundreds of people throughout Europe and the former Soviet republics since the most recent resurgence in use began in Estonia in the early 2000s, and novel derivatives continue to appear.

As acrylamide derivatives are often used in drug discovery to make covalent inhibitors which will bind irreversibly to its target, acrylfentanyl is claimed to be naloxone resistant. 
However, acute intoxications with acrylfentanyl on mice threatened by naloxone (2 mg/kg) have shown that acrylfentanyl could be displaced from the opioid receptor.

Acrylfentanyl has been linked to 20 deaths in Sweden as well as two deaths in Denmark in summer 2016.

Legal status 

Acrylfentanyl is a Schedule I controlled substance in the United States.  As of 16 August 2016, it is an illegal medicine in Sweden.

See also 

 3-Methylbutyrfentanyl
 4-Fluorobutyrfentanyl
 4-Methoxybutyrfentanyl
 Acetylfentanyl
 Butyrfentanyl
 Furanylfentanyl
 List of fentanyl analogues

References 

Acrylamides
Anilides
Designer drugs
Mu-opioid receptor agonists
Piperidines
Synthetic opioids
Fentanyl